HMS Loyal was a L-class destroyer built for the Royal Navy in the late 1930s, although she was not completed until after World War II had begun.

Description
The L-class destroyers were designed as enlarged and improved versions of the preceding J class equipped with dual-purpose guns. They were powered by Parsons geared steam turbines, each driving one propeller shaft,
using steam for was provided by two Admiralty three-drum boilers. The L class' complement was 190 officers and ratings.

The ships mounted six 4.7-inch (120 mm) Mark XI guns in twin-gun mounts, two superfiring in front of the bridge and one aft of the superstructure. Their light anti-aircraft suite was composed of one quadruple mount for 2-pounder "pom-pom" guns and six single Oerlikon 20 mm cannon. Later in the war, twin Oerlikon mounts replaced the singles. The L-class ships were fitted with two above-water quadruple mounts for  torpedoes. The ships were equipped with 45 depth charges.

Construction and career
Loyal was laid down on 23 November 1938 by Scotts Shipbuilding and Engineering Company at their Greenock shipyard, launched on 8 October 1941 and completed on 31 October 1942. She struck a mine on 12 October 1944 and was declared a constructive total loss.

Notes

References

External links

 

L and M-class destroyers of the Royal Navy
Ships built on the River Clyde
1940 ships
World War II destroyers of the United Kingdom
Maritime incidents in October 1944